The 2019 Federation Tournament of Champions took place at the Cool Insuring Arena in Glens Falls on March 22, 23 and 24. Federation championships were awarded in the AA, A and B classifications. Long Island Lutheran in Brookville won the Class AA championship. Andre Curbelo of Long Island Lutheran was named the Class AA tournament's most valuable player. Joseph Girard III of Glens Falls was named the Class B tournament's most valuable player and finished his high school basketball career with a state-record 4,763 points.

Class AA 

Participating teams, results and individual honors in Class AA were as follows:

Participating teams

Results 

Long Island Lutheran finished the season with a 25–2 record.

Individual honors 

The following players were awarded individual honors for their performances at the Federation Tournament:

Most Valuable Player 

 Andre Curbelo, Long Island Lutheran

All-Tournament Team 

 Jalen Celestine, Long Island Lutheran
 Moussa Cisse, Christ the King 	
 Essam Mostafa, Long Island Lutheran
 Kadary Richmond, South Shore Campus
 Lucas Sutherland, West Genesee

Class A 

Participating teams, results and individual honors in Class A were as follows:

Participating teams

Results 

Albany Academy finished the season with a 19–3 record.

Individual honors 

The following players were awarded individual honors for their performances at the Federation Tournament:

Most Valuable Player 

 August Mahoney, Albany Academy

All-Tournament Team 

 Andre Jackson, Albany Academy
 Derek Jeter Mejia, Frederick Douglass Academy	
 Ebuka Nnagbo, Park
 Davontrey Thomas, Poughkeepsie
 Mohamed Wague, Frederick Douglass Academy

Class B 

Participating teams, results and individual honors in Class B were as follows:

Participating teams

Results 

Glens Falls finished the season with a 29–1 record.

Individual honors 

The following players were awarded individual honors for their performances at the Federation Tournament:

Most Valuable Player 

 Joseph Girard III, Glens Falls

All-Tournament Team 

 Jordan Agyemang, South Bronx Prep
 Trent Girard, Glens Falls
 Justin Hemphill, Cardinal O'Hara
 Haakim Siner, Cardinal O'Hara
 Tyler Saint-Furcy, Lawrence Woodmere Academy

External links 

 http://www.nysbasketballbrackets.com/

References

High school basketball competitions in the United States
High school sports in New York (state)
Sports in Glens Falls, New York
Basketball competitions in New York (state)
High
New York